The yellow shovelnose stingaree (Trygonoptera galba) is a little-known species of stingray in the family Urolophidae, endemic to the outer continental shelf off Western Australia at a depth of . There are prominent lobes outside of its nostrils, and a skirt-shaped flap of skin with a deeply fringed trailing margin in between. Above, this ray is an almost completely uniform light to dark yellow color, which darkens on the caudal fin. The International Union for Conservation of Nature (IUCN) assesses the yellow shovelnose stingaree as least concern, as there is minimal fishing within its range.

Taxonomy
The first specimens of the yellow shovelnose stingaree were collected by the Taiwanese ship FV Hai Kung during the winter of 1981, when it was conducting exploratory fishery surveys off Western Australia. The ray was provisionally identified as Trygonoptera "sp. A" before being formally described by Peter Last and Gordon Yearsley in a 2008 Commonwealth Scientific and Industrial Research Organisation (CSIRO) publication. The specific epithet is derived from the Latin galbus ("yellow"), in reference to its coloration. This species is closely related to the western shovelnose stingaree (T. mucosa).

Distribution and habitat
A similar shovelnose stingaree found from Rottnest Island to the western Great Australian Bight may also be of this species. This fairly common, bottom-dwelling ray prefers sandy habitats.

Description
The yellow shovelnose stingaree has an oval pectoral fin disc slightly wider than long, with the anterior margins weakly convex and converging at an obtuse angle on a fairly elongated, fleshy snout. The tip of the snout does not protrude past the disc. The eyes are medium-sized, well-spaced, and slightly elevated. The spiracles behind the eyes are comma-shaped, with the "tail" curving beneath to the level of the mid-eye; the posterior margins of the spiracles are angular. The outer rim of each nostril is enlarged into a prominent lobe. Between the nostrils is a skirt-shaped curtain of skin with a deeply fringed posterior margin that overhangs the small mouth. The lower jaw conceals the upper jaw and bears a prominent, corrugated patch of papillae (nipple-like structures). The small teeth have oval to diamond-shaped bases and are arranged in a quincunx pattern; the crowns range from pointed near the middle of the jaws to blunt at the sides. There are 19–20 upper and 22–23 lower tooth rows. The floor of the mouth bears eight or more papillae. The five pairs of gill slits are S-shaped.

The pelvic fins are roughly triangular; the males have short, thick claspers. The tail measures less than an eighth as long as the disc and is moderately flattened at the base, tapering smoothly to a lance-shaped caudal fin. There are no dorsal fins or fin folds. A single, serrated stinging spine is placed atop the tail, well behind the base. The skin is devoid of dermal denticles. The upper surface of the disc and tail are a deep, even yellow to yellowish brown in color, becoming darker on the caudal fin. The underside is white to yellowish, sometimes with darker fin margins and/or irregular dusky blotches on the belly.

Biology and ecology
Virtually nothing is known of the natural history of the yellow shovelnose stingaree. It is presumably aplacental viviparous like other stingrays.

Human interactions
The International Union for Conservation of Nature (IUCN) currently lacks sufficient information to assess the conservation status of the yellow shovelnose stingaree. The species faces little fishing pressure, as the depth range it occupies lies largely between the operating depths of coastal prawn fisheries and the small-scale Western Deepwater Trawl Fishery. It would potentially benefit from the implementation of the 2004 Australian National Plan of Action for the Conservation and Management of Sharks.

References

External links
 Fishes of Australia : Trygonoptera galba

yellow shovelnose stingaree
Marine fish of Western Australia
Vertebrates of Western Australia
Taxa named by Peter R. Last
Taxa named by Gordon K. Yearsley
yellow shovelnose stingaree
Taxonomy articles created by Polbot